Pulikkottil Joseph Mar Dionysious II (Mar Dionysious V) (12 November 1833 – 11 July 1909) was the Malankara Metropolitan of the Malankara Church, was born into the family of Pulikkottil (Kunnamkulam). He was the 14th Malankara Metropolitan.

Early life
Pulikkottil is a family which moved from Arthat and settled in Kunnamkulam. Tharu Kurien, a member of this family was the nephew of Pulikkottil Joseph Mar Dionysious I. Joseph (Pulikkottil Joseph Mar Dionysious II) was born as the son of Tharu Kurien and Thandamma, daughter of Paingamukku Kuthooru Geevarghese Kathanaar, on 12 November 1833.

In addition to theology and Syriac he learned Sanskrit and Hindustani at Kunnamkulam.

Ordination
He received the deaconship from Cheppad Mar Dionysius on 6 October 1846 and on 18 August 1853 he was ordained as a priest by Metropolitan Yuyakim Mar Kurilos at Challiserry church.

On 29 April 1865 at Ameed (modern day Diyarbakır), Patriarch Yakoob II elevated him to the rank of Ramban. On 30 April he was consecrated as Metropolitan Joseph Mar Dionysios.

Malankara Metropolitan
During the eventful forty-four years between 1865 A.D to 1909 he adorned the Malankara Metropolitan's position with extraordinary skill. It was during his period that the Mulanthuruthy Synod presided by Ignatius Peter IV Patriarch of Antioch, division of dioceses and the 'Holy Mooran Koodasha' took place. Through his unstinting effort, spiritual organisations like Sunday School and Students movement, and Church institutions like Parumala Seminary, Kunnamkulam Sehiyon Bungalow, Kottapuram Seminary and Kottayam M.D. Seminary developed.

Golden Jubilee
In 1901, the grand occasion of the golden jubilee of Ordination of Mar Dionysius V was celebrated like a festival in the city of Kottayam.

Student movement
During his reign as Malankara Metropolitan, the prominent clergy, laymen and zealous students including members of the diaspora came together with the idea of initiating a Students' Movement of the Church by late 1907. The first annual conference of this Movement was held at Balikamadom School, Thiruvalla on 1, 2 and 3 January 1908 with the blessings of Mar Dionysius V. During this conference, Rev Fr. V. J. Geevarghese Ramban (of Vattasseril) made a captivating speech on 'The Rituals in our Church'. This Movement grew in strength and stretch, expanding its reach to the students abroad with the motto Worship, Study, Service, assuming the name Mar Gregorios Christian Students Movement commemorating St. Gregorios of Parumala by Mor Athanasius Paulose Kuttikkattil ,Metropolitan of Malankara Orthodox Church, this student movement is now known as Mar Gregorios Orthodox Christian Student Movement

Last days
After entrusting the responsibilities of his office to his successor Mar Dionysius VI, Pulikkottil Joseph Mar Dionysious II died on 11 July 1909. His mortal remains were interred in the northern side of the chapel in the Old Seminary (Pazhaya Seminary, known as the Orthodox Theological Seminary). The Church observes the day of his memorial on 12 July. The Episcopal Synod honoured his memory by conferring the designation "Malankara Sabha-Thejas" (Malayalam: മലങ്കര സഭാ തേജസ്‌, meaning 'radiance of the Church').

Succession

Biographies
Of the many biographies of Mar Dionysius V published till date, one of the most authoritative works is 'The Biography of Mar Dionysius V' written and published by Kandathil Varghese Mappillai.

See also
 Malankara Orthodox Syrian Church
 List of Catholicoi of the East and Malankara Metropolitans
 Pulikkottil Joseph Mar Dionysious I (Mar Thoma X)

References

Further reading
https://archive.today/20140528070345/http://mgocsmdiaspora.org/blog/sabha-thejas-pulikottil-mar-dionysiusa-socio-political-leader-with-a-christian-vision/
Cherian, Dr. C. V. Orthodox Christianity in India. Academic Publishers, College Road, Kottayam. 2003.
Rev. Dr. Joseph Cheeran, Adv. P. C. Mathew Pulikottil, K. V. Mammen. Indian Orthodox Church History and Culture. Kottackal publications, Kottayam. 2002
P. V. Mathew. Keralathile Nazranikal, (Malayalam) Vol 3. Ernakulam. 1995.
M. P. Varkey Malankara Edavakuday Mar Dionysious Metropolitan.(Malayalam) Pub. Malayala Manorama. 1901

External links 
 http://marthoman.tv/dionysius_ii_pulikkottil/index.html – Life and works of Joseph Mar Dionysius Pulikkottil II Malankara Metropolitan
 http://www.kudassanad.com/html/spritual.html – Primates of Malankara Orthodox Church
 http://www.syrianchurch.org/PulikottilII/Pulikottil.htm – Biography of Pulikottil Thirumeni
 https://web.archive.org/web/20070927043211/http://www.indianchristianity.org/orthodox/former_catholicos1.html
  * https://web.archive.org/web/20070709055921/http://www.aolplaza.com/mosc/MENUhtms/Orphanages.htm
 http://www.syrianchurch.org/PulikottilII/Pulikkottil.htm – Detailed biography of Pulikottil Thirumeni

Indian Christian religious leaders
Oriental Orthodoxy in India
People from Thrissur district
Syriac Orthodox Church bishops
1833 births
1909 deaths
Christian clergy from Kerala
Malankara Orthodox Syrian Church
Malankara Orthodox Syrian Church bishops
Malankara Orthodox Syrian Church Christians